The Lou Ruvo Center for Brain Health (LRCBH), officially the Cleveland Clinic Lou Ruvo Center for Brain Health, opened on May 21, 2010, in Las Vegas, Nevada. It is operated by the Cleveland Clinic and was designed by Frank Gehry.

History
Keep Memory Alive (also known as KMA) was founded by Larry Ruvo, senior managing partner of Southern Wines and Spirits, in memory of his father, Lou Ruvo, a victim of Alzheimer's disease, together with his wife Camille, Mirage Resorts CEO Bobby Baldwin (who also lost his father to Alzheimer's disease), and Bobby Baldwin's wife Donna.  KMA supports the mission of the Lou Ruvo Center for Brain Health and has held several star-studded galas, attended by celebrities and notables from around the world. It has become one of Las Vegas' most important charity initiatives and a key participant in the fight against Alzheimer's disease. Since its inception, the event has raised more than $20 million towards achieving its goal – the realization of the Lou Ruvo Center for Brain Health.  Funds committed by such supporters as the Spector Family Foundation, the Roland and Terri Sturm Foundation, Steinberg Diagnostics, the Hard Rock Hotel and Casino and America Online were utilized for the construction and continued operation of this state-of-the-art facility.  The center has become a national resource for the most current research and scientific information for the treatment of Alzheimer's, Parkinson's, Huntington's disease, multiple sclerosis, and ALS (Lou Gehrig's Disease); also focusing on prevention, early detection, and education.

Design
The ceremonial groundbreaking of the Lou Ruvo Center for Brain Health occurred on February 9, 2007. Dignitaries who attended the groundbreaking ceremonies for the $70 million project included founder Larry Ruvo, Frank Gehry, U.S. Senator Harry Reid and John Ensign; U.S. Representative Shelley Berkley, Jon Porter and Dean Heller, Gov. Jim Gibbons, Mayor Oscar Goodman, former Gov. Kenny Guinn, Gov. Arnold Schwarzenegger, Kevin Spacey, and John Cusack. The center operates as an outpatient treatment and research facility in downtown Las Vegas on land deeded to Keep Memory Alive, the fund raising arm of LRCBH, by the City of Las Vegas as part of its  Symphony Park. The center also serves as the headquarters for Keep Memory Alive, the Las Vegas Alzheimer's Association and the Las Vegas Parkinson's Disease Association.

Gallery

See also 
 Ray and Maria Stata Center, Massachusetts

References

External links

 Cleveland Clinic Nevada, the Lou Ruvo Center for Brain Health
 Keep Memory Alive
 Keep Memory Alive Event Center
 VegasTodayAndTomorrow's Ruvo Center page

Cleveland Clinic
Frank Gehry buildings
Buildings and structures in Las Vegas
Healthcare in Las Vegas
Alzheimer's and dementia organizations
Health charities in the United States
Downtown Las Vegas
Hospital buildings completed in 2010
Architecture in Nevada
Deconstructivism
Postmodern architecture in the United States
Charities based in Nevada
Symphony Park
Mental health organizations in Nevada
2010 establishments in Nevada
Visionary environments